The Exira–Elk Horn–Kimballton (Exira–EHK) Community School District is a rural public school district headquartered in Elk Horn, Iowa. It consists of two buildings, one in Elk Horn and one in Exira.

The district is mostly within Audubon and Shelby counties, and it has smaller sections in Cass and Guthrie counties. It serves Elk Horn, Exira, Kimballton, and Brayton.

History
It was formed as a merger of the Elk Horn–Kimballton Community School District and the Exira Community School District. The Exira school district had operated at a deficit in several of the years preceding the merger. The consolidation was effective July 1, 2014. 628 people voted in favor and 82 voted against. It was anticipated that 450 students total would attend the already-consolidated schools; the districts had been in a grade-sharing arrangement in which students from one district attended school in another district.

Schools
A preschool, kindergarten, and middle school are in Exira. A preschool, kindergarten, elementary school and senior high school share a building in Elk Horn.

Exira–Elk Horn–Kimballton Elementary
Exira–Elk Horn–Kimballton High School

Exira–Elk Horn–Kimballton High School

Athletics
The Spartans compete in the Rolling Valley Conference in the following sports:

Baseball
Basketball (boys and girls)
Cross country (boys and girls)
Football
Softball
Track and field (boys and girls)
Volleyball
Wrestling

See also
List of school districts in Iowa
List of high schools in Iowa

References

External links
 Exira-EHK Community School District

School districts in Iowa
Education in Audubon County, Iowa
Education in Cass County, Iowa
Education in Guthrie County, Iowa
Education in Shelby County, Iowa
2014 establishments in Iowa
School districts established in 2014